The 1997 Yonex All England Open was the 87th edition of the All England Open Badminton Championships. It was held from 10 to 15 March 1997, in Birmingham, England.

It was a five-star tournament and the prize money was US$125,000.

Venue
National Indoor Arena

Final results

Men's singles

Section 1

Section 2

Women's singles

Section 1

Section 2

References

External links
Smash: 1997 All England Open 

All England Open Badminton Championships
All England Open
All England
Sports competitions in Birmingham, West Midlands
March 1997 sports events in the United Kingdom